St. Mary's Jacobite Syrian Soonoro Cathedral is an ancient Jacobite Syrian church located in Angamaly built in 1564 by Archdeacon Giwargis of Christ, it is one of the most prominent and ancient Syriac Orthodox churches in Kerala. Akapparambu Church is the most ancient church in Angamaly region and this church was a united parish with Akapparambu church for long time. Hence Akapparambu church was called valiyapally and this church was called cheriyapally in olden days. In the seventeenth century it was the residence of Archdeacon Thomas Parambil, who eventually got consecrated as bishop Mar Thoma I. It was the seat of the Archdeacon and later the Malankara Metropolitans, the local heads of the pre-20th century Malankara Church and hence held an important position in the church for several centuries.

History

Tradition says that Apostle St. Thomas arrived India in AD 52 and sowed the seeds of the Gospel and about 400 Syrian families immigrated in AD 345 under the leadership of the merchant Knayi Thoma to a town named Mahathevar patnam, near Muziris, the famous port of Kodungalloor. This was the first known centre of Christians in India. Jews who had engaged in trade with the coast of Malabar had inhabited the city much earlier and had rights to land and other privileges there. However Kodungalloor subsequently became less hospitable to Christians who took refuge in Angamaly. The local chieftain of "Mangattu", also referred to as "Mangattachan", graciously welcomed Christians into the area and granted them many privileges including the right to establish a church, a market and a town in 'Anke malee' (later Angamaly). The land for the Church in Angamaly was granted to the Syrian Christians next to his palace premises as a noble gesture. Thus the church was built with wood and thatched roofing in a location adjacent to the palace of the chieftain and in closer proximity to the palace. The number of Christians in Angamali swelled with further migrations, perhaps predominantly  following the great flood in Periyar in 1341 that stilted the waters of the Muziris port. Later in 1523 the Muslim traders burnt down the Christian commercial establishments of Kodungallur and their church.  

However, as noted by Melchior Carneiro, there was only one church back then in Angamali in 1550s and it was in the name of "Holy Virgin the Mother of Christ, the light and life". In 1564, the Cheriapally dedicated to St. Mary (of Assumption), which is the first church in Angamali, was erected by Archdeacon George of Christ, who was appointed as the Archdeacon circa 1562 by Chaldean archbishop Mar Iosep. On 2 January 1576, Keshava Rama Varma, the King of Cochin, sent a letter to Pope Gregory XIII to express his concern over the Roman Catholic missionaries' misconduct to the then Metropolitan Abraham. The King also writes about the new church in Angamaly: The Archdeacon George, likewise Our subject, has recently erected a church under the title of the Assumption of Our Lady in August, for which he requests me to obtain from Your Holiness certain Indulgences, which if granted, I shall regard as a favour done to me.  
George of Christ built this church following his election as the bishop of Palur in the diocesan assembly. This church is adorned by beautiful mural paintings, chandeliers and wooden carvings. In 1566, Chaldean Patriarch Abdisho IV Maron gave his accent to the election and appointed George of Christ as the bishop of Palur and coadjutor of the Archdiocese of Angamaly to ensure a successor to Metropolitan Abraham. However, the succession plan failed due to the death of the Archdeacon.

Archdeacons
Archdeacons of Pakalomattom family including Giwargis of Christ (George of Christ), Archdeacon John,  Giwargis of the Cross (Archdeacon George of the Cross) and Parambil Thoma used the Angamaly Cheriyapally as their administrative headquarters. Givargis of Christ and Parambil Thoma were entombed in this Church.

Synod of Diamper
The whole parish defied the decrees of the Synod of Diamper in 1599 and firmly stood with the Archdeacon in resisting the Portuguese Padroado. The Catholic historian Fr. Bernard records that the Syrian Christians in Mangad, Kochi, Purakad, and Thekkumkur who were loyal to Archdeacon George of Cross were threatened by local kings and Petty chieftains to attend the Synod of Diamper in 1599, as commanded by the Portuguese. The Raja of Cochin decreed that all assets of Syrian churches which abstain from the Synod of Diamper on 20 June 1599 will be confiscated. The Angamaly Church defied the command and boycotted the Synod unanimously; All the eighteen priests of the church abstained from the Synod. The militant Portuguese bishop through threats and offers of military and monetary support to the local king and chieftains managed to create a schism among Saint Thomas Christians and created a substantial Catholic presence in Angamaly.

After Coonan Cross Oath 
After the Coonan Cross Oath of 1653, a delegate of the Syriac Orthodox Patriarch of Antioch, Gregorios Abdal Jaleel an archbishop of Jerusalem, arrived in Malabar. In 1665 he regularized the consecration of Thoma I as the first Metropolitan Bishop of Malankara. At first during his reign Thoma I was assisted by Angamaly Vengoor Gevarghese Kathanar, Kadavil Chandy Kathanar, Parambil Chandy, and Anjimootil Itty Thoman Kathanar, who lead the Coonan Cross Oath in 1653. 

After the Synod of Diamper and Coonan Cross Oath, which lead to the schism among the Saint Thomas Christians, the Angamaly Cheriyapally came under the control of the Jacobite faction, who were known by then as the Puthenkoor. 84 out of the 116 total churches, including the Angamaly Valiyapalli, located next to the St Marys Cheriyapally Church, came under Syrian Catholic governance. However, Thoma I maintained his seat at Angamaly Cheriyapally. The 32 churches that remained with Archdeacon Parambil Thomas, continued to be administered by him from Angamaly. He was buried in this church in 1670. 

Anquetil Duperron, who visited Malabar in the eighteenth century, gives the following list and description of churches in Angamaly in the country of the Velutha Thavali ruler:
 Saint George church, [co-owned by] Syrian Catholics and schismatics. (In this church there is a chapel dedicated to Saint George in which the schismatics celebrate their liturgy  after the Catholics.)
 Another Church (at the end of the Angamale Bazaar), dedicated to Saint Ormisdas Martyr, Catholic. The see of the Archbishop of the Serra [Malabar] was once at Angamale. Under the Portuguese, in 1615, it was transferred to Cranganore). 
 Another Church dedicated to the Blessed Virgin (presumably it is St. Mary's church as the Residence of the Archdeacon of Malabar Mar Thomas).
He then mentions a fourth church in the country of the Velutha Thavali, which is at Akaparambu and dedicated to Mar Sabor & Mar Proth, co-owned by Syrian Catholics and schismatics.

According to tradition, Mar Yoohanon who represented the Malankara Church at the Holy Synod of Ephesus in AD 431 stayed at Marth Maryam Valiyapally Kothamangalam and had visited Ankamaly church.

For many centuries this church  and the Akaparambu Church (Mar Sabor and Mar Afroth) were a united parish and was administered by one council as is evident in the record of a general body meeting of 16-8-1069 (Malayalam Era).

Estrangelo Bible
In 1808 an ancient Bible  written during the headship of Dionysius the Great at the Angamaly church was presented to the Anglican missionary Rev. Claudius Buchanan; This Bible is now preserved in the archives of the Cambridge University Library. This Syriac Bible might have been brought to India by Fathers from the Holy See of Antioch as in its appendix you can see intercessory prayers to St. Mary and Mar Severios. This Estrangelo Bible written in East Syriac might have been from the Persian Catholicate of the Syrian Orthodox Church.

Gallery

References

Sources

External links

 Jacobite Syrian Christian Church on Facebook
 Jacobite Syrian Christian Church
 Online Community and News Site of Jacobite Syrian Orthodox Church
 News Site Of Jacobite Syrian Orthodox Church
 Indian Christianity
 Malankara Syriac Orthodox Resources
  Malankara Jacobite Syriac Christian Network

Syriac Orthodox churches in India
Soonoro churches in Kerala
1564 establishments in India
Churches in Angamaly